Missile range may refer to:
 Missile Range Instrumentation Ship
 Pan American Airways Guided Missile Range Division
 Ballistic missiles classified according to their range
 Missile test range

Locations
 Pacific Missile Range Facility
 White Sands Missile Range

See also
 Spaceport
 Pacific Missile Range